The Cub Crafters CC11-100 Sport Cub S2 is a high-wing, tandem-seat, conventional landing gear–equipped, tube-and-fabric light-sport aircraft built by Cub Crafters. The aircraft certified to ATSM standards for the FAA's Light Sport Category and is in production as of 2010. The S2 was introduced in 2007 as an improvement to the Sport Cub of 2005.

Design and development
Cub Crafters started business as a heavy maintenance and overhaul shop for classic Piper aircraft. In 1998, Cub Crafters started production of all-new aircraft leading to the Sport Cub built to meet the FAA's Light Sport requirements.

The aircraft follows the same basic design and shape as the Piper Cub. Notable exceptions are a  fully cowled Teledyne Continental engine, an electrical system and a modified USA 35b airfoil from the SuperCub.

Operational history
In 2007, Scott Carson, CEO of Boeing, purchased an S2 for his own personal use.

Variants
CC11-100 Sport Cub
Base model.
Super Sport Cub

Specifications (CC11-100 Sport Cub S2)

See also

References

2000s United States sport aircraft
Sport Cub S2
High-wing aircraft
Single-engined tractor aircraft